Harbans Singh Jandu, also known as Jandu Littranwala, is an Indian music composer associated with Punjabi music.

Life and career
Jandu was born in the village of Littran in Jalandhar District, Punjab.

He first started writing lyrics for Punjabi songs in 1968. He placed first (out of 52 composers) in the Des Pardes paper songwriting competition, with the song "Nachdi di Photo Kich Mundeya", in 1968.

He has written songs for many famous Bhangra and Punjabi artists, including AS Kang, Kuldip Manak, Surinder Shinda, Balwinder Safri, Jazzy B, Sukhshinder Shinda, H-Dhami, Amrinder Gill, Azaad, Alaap, Heera Group UK, Holle Holle, Apna Sangeet, Awaaz, Bhujhangy Group, DCS, Dippa Satrang, Gurcharran Mall, Yudhvir Manak, Sardara Gill, KS Bhamrah, Aman Hayer, Boota Pardesi, Gurdeep Gogi, The Saathies, Karnail Cheema, Silinder Pardesi, Gurdev Kaur, Mastan Heera, ADH, Atma Geet, Mahendra Kapoor, Baldev Mastana, Parmjit Pammi, Kamaljit Neeru, Hrinder Singh Shergill and many others.

Hit songs
Some of his hit songs include:

 "Giddhian Di Raniye" by AS Kang 
 Chan Mere Makhna by Balwinder Safri
 "Vang" and Taubah Taubah by ADH
 "Sardara" by Jazzy B
 "Jithevi Jaan" Punjabi by Azaad
 "Soorma" by Jazzy B
 "Jadu" by Jazzy B
 "I Love You" by Jazzy B
 "Rajj Ke Palaa" by Jas Singh/Aman Hayer
 "Mohabat Hogai" by Azaad
 "Jatti Bul Bul Wargi" by Parmjit Pammi
 "Lishke Long Te Jhanjar" by The Saathies
 "Ha La La" – Ajuba (featured on the Bhaji on the Beach film soundtrack
 Sadke Java - H Dhami

Religious songs
Harbans Jandu has also written many religious songs. These include:

"Babe Nanak Di" by Jazzy B
"Ik Dhar Hai Babe Nanak Da by Balwant Littranwala
"Amar Khalsa" by Pardesi
"Mata Gujri" by Balwinder Safri
"Jakare Bholan Ge" by Jazzy B
"Choj Khalse De" by Sukshinder Shinda

Awards
Jandu Littranwala received an accolade from the Chief Minister of Punjab, Parkash Singh Badal, on 20 January 2009 in Hoshiarpur, Punjab, for his contribution in promoting the Punjabi language throughout the world through his song writing.

Jandu Littranwala was presented with the Guest of Honour award at the Lal Chand Yamla Jatt Mela on 26 December 2008.

 Asian Pop Awards: four times Best Lyricist, from 1982
 UK Asian Pop Awards: Best Lyricist, 1992
 Nand Lal Nooorpuri Award, 2005
 Tricentury Khalsa Award Southampton, 1999
 Punjab Times and Des Pardes Best writer Award, 1996
 Lyallpur Khalsa College, Jalandhar – honorary award for promoting Punjabi language and culture worldwide through his songs
 BBC Radio WM, 2004
 Best Songwriter award 2004, by Punjabi Cultural Society, Coventry
 Youth Sports Award, Littran 2004/2007 for promoting  Punjabi language and culture worldwide through his songs
 Punjabi Kala Manch Kohinoor Award for Best Songwriter
 Sandwell Council awarded him for promoting Punjabi language and culture worldwide through his songs
 Wolverhampton City Council awarded him for promoting Wolverhampton worldwide through his songs, 2008
 House Of Commons Cultural Award, 2006
 House of Commons Award Vaiskahi, 2007
 Awarded Gold Medal for Best Lyricist in Vancouver, British Columbia, Canada
 Awarded Gold Medal for Best Songwriter in Jalandhar, India
 Awarded Gold Medal for Best Lyricist by Lal Chand Yamla Jatt Trust in Birmingham, UK
 Awarded Gold Medal for Best Lyricist by Dev Thrikewala Appreciation Trust in Derby, UK
 Awarded Gold Medal for Best Lyricist by Leamington Mela Committee in Leamington, UK
Awarded  Gold Medal for Best Songwriter by Punjabi Sath, Walsall, UK

References

External links
 The Truth Behind Putt Sardara De

Indian lyricists
Punjabi music
Bhangra (music)
Living people
Year of birth missing (living people)